Women's University in Africa (WUA) is a "private university which is supported through student fees and donors from around the globe", established in 2002 and located in Marondera, Zimbabwe.
It has a student enrolment policy of 80% women and 20% men. The Women's University in Africa aims to address gender disparity and foster equity until there is equity in accessing tertiary education; and to work on knowledge and skills in areas of vital importance for women.

Universities and colleges in Zimbabwe
Buildings and structures in Mashonaland East Province
Education in Mashonaland East Province
Educational institutions established in 2002
2002 establishments in Zimbabwe
Marondera